László Móra (14 December 1934 – 3 November 2001) was a Hungarian equestrian. He competed at the 1960 Summer Olympics and the 1972 Summer Olympics.

References

1934 births
2001 deaths
Hungarian male equestrians
Olympic equestrians of Hungary
Equestrians at the 1960 Summer Olympics
Equestrians at the 1972 Summer Olympics
Sportspeople from Budapest